Little Blighty on the Down was a satirical radio comedy series broadcast on BBC Radio 4 between 1988 and 1992. It was a parody of contemporary life in Britain as seen in the small village of Little Blighty. (Blighty being an old affectionate nickname for Britain; a down is a chalk hill, such as in England's South Downs; the village's name is thus suggestive of a Britain which is "little" rather than "great" in terms of importance or governance, and which shouldn't be described as being "on the up").

Comedian Jo Kendall starred as Mrs Roberts, domineering leader of the Parish Council, who engaged in rather one-sided battles with her tongue-tied rival, Working men's club president Mr Blandish.

Each of the weekly half-hour episodes would lampoon a particular political theme, e.g. party politics, the environment, health care, privatisations, the Cold War, the European Union, the criminal justice system, glasnost and perestroika, South Africa under apartheid. Current events would be used for some plot elements, e.g. the release of Nelson Mandela, the election of Solidarity in Poland, or the England football team versus West Germany.

Roberts's ruling party on the council are the Rotarians, in other words they are from the powerful and privileged sections of society but see themselves as being benevolent politicians, and are a satire on the Conservative Party. The series regularly lampooned Margaret Thatcher's perceived domineering attitude towards her Cabinet, through Mrs Roberts's heavy-handed management of her fellow councillors, accompanied by withering one-liners at their expense (delivered in Jo Kendall's foghorn-like vocal imitation of "Mrs T").

Their main opponents, at the Working Men's Club (a microcosm of the British Labour Party) are working-class folk whose ambitions to take power from the Rotarians are constantly frustrated by their own indecisiveness and internal fighting. Labour mud-slinging and party figures such as Tony Benn and Neil Kinnock were sent up.

The wider world and the UK's relations with it made appearances in the shape of Little Blighty's neighbours. To the west across a river lies the business-dominated city of Nukem, and to the east the city of Megaton, run by a dictatorial bureaucracy.

Nearer to Blighty is the richer, bratwurst-eating, BMW-driving town of Greater Krauton, hopefully soon to be united with their Megaton-like neighbours the Lesser Krauts.

The resource-laden, out-of-town supermarket Oppresto's (its name a parody of actual contemporary supermarket chain Presto), with its slavedriving managers like Mr F.W., downtrodden workforce, and rebellious trade union shop steward Mr Freeman, presents a moral dilemma for the Blightish. Is it morally right to benefit by trading with such an exploitative operation?

At home the Blighty Bugle with its fearless reporter and nervous editor, and the local aristocratic Lady, with her mansion and relatives, would stand in for the real-world Press and British Royal Family.

Episode list

External links
 
Little Blighty on the Down at the Radiolistings website

BBC Radio comedy programmes
BBC Radio 4 programmes